Jame' Asr Hassanil Bolkiah Mosque, (Jawi:                         جامع عصر حسن البلقية) is a mosque in Bandar Seri Begawan, Brunei. It is named after Hassanal Bolkiah, the 29th and current Sultan of Brunei. It is one of the two state mosques, the other Omar Ali Saifuddien Mosque.

History 
The mosque is a waqf of Sultan Hassanal Bolkiah. The construction began in 1988 on a 20-acre site in Kiarong. The mosque was inaugurated on 14 July 1994 with the Sultan attending the Maghrib and Isha prayers in conjunction with His Majesty's 48th birthday celebration.

Building 
Jame' Asr Hassanil Bolkiah Mosque is the largest mosque in the country and can accommodate 5,000 worshippers at a time.

See also
 List of mosques in Brunei

References

1994 establishments in Brunei
Mosques completed in 1991
Buildings and structures in Bandar Seri Begawan
Mosques in Brunei